Emilio Badini (4 August 1897 – 4 August 1956) was an Italian Argentine professional footballer who played as a midfielder.

Biography
Badini was born in Rosario, Santa Fe Argentina and had Argentine citizenship but represented Italy internationally, thanks to his Bolognese parents.

Club career
Badini played for 8 seasons with Bologna F.C. 1909 between 1913 and 1921. He later also represented SPAL and Virtus Bologna.

International career
Badini made his debut for the Italy national football team on 31 August 1920 in a 1920 Summer Olympics game against Norway and scored a winning goal in extra time, which was his only international goal. In total he made two international appearances, both of which came that year.

Personal life
Emilio Badini's older brother Angelo Badini and younger brothers Cesare Badini and Augusto Badini all played for Bologna. To distinguish them, Angelo was referred to as Badini I, Emilio as Badini II, Cesare as Badini III and Augusto as Badini IV.

References

External links
 
 

1897 births
1956 deaths
Italian footballers
Bologna F.C. 1909 players
S.P.A.L. players
Italy international footballers
Serie A players
Olympic footballers of Italy
Footballers at the 1920 Summer Olympics
People of Emilian descent
Association football midfielders